The 2016 North Dakota Fighting Hawks football team represented the University of North Dakota during the 2016 NCAA Division I FCS football season. They were led by third-year head coach Bubba Schweigert and played their home games at the Alerus Center.  The Fighting Hawks were a member of the Big Sky Conference. They finished the season 9–3, 8–0 in Big Sky play to share the conference championship with Eastern Washington. They received an at-large bid into the FCS Playoffs where they lost to Richmond in the second round.

Previous season
In 2015, North Dakota finished with a record of 7–4, 5–3 in Big Sky play, to finish in a tie for third place. They failed to qualify for the FCS Playoffs.

Schedule

Game summaries

Stony Brook

Bowling Green

South Dakota

Montana State

Cal Poly

Sacramento State

Southern Utah

Idaho State

Weber State

Northern Colorado

Northern Arizona

FCS Playoffs

Second Round–Richmond

Ranking movements

References

North Dakota
North Dakota Fighting Hawks football seasons
Big Sky Conference football champion seasons
North Dakota
North Dakota Fighting Hawks football